Alan Emmanuel Vidal Solís (born March 18, 1993, in Zacualpan, Morelos), known as Alan Vidal, is a Mexican professional association football (soccer) player who plays for Cruz Azul Hidalgo.

See also
List of people from Morelos, Mexico

External links
 

Living people
1993 births
Cruz Azul footballers
Club Atlético Zacatepec players
Liga MX players
Ascenso MX players
Liga Premier de México players
Footballers from Morelos
Association football defenders
Cruz Azul Hidalgo footballers
Mexican footballers